Agronomovca is a commune in Ungheni District, Moldova. It is composed of four villages: Mănoilești, Novaia Nicolaevca, Rezina and Vulpești.

References

Communes of Ungheni District